Raymond Simon Lamanno (November 17, 1919 – February 9, 1994) was an American professional baseball player. A catcher, he appeared in 442 games played in the Major Leagues for the Cincinnati Reds (1941–1942; 1946–1948). He threw and batted right-handed.

Lamanno's career was interrupted by World War II service in the United States Navy in the Pacific Theater of Operations.

In , Lamanno was selected as a National League All-Star.  He appeared in the game, at Fenway Park and won 12–0 by the American League, as a pinch hitter and grounded out against Jack Kramer of the St. Louis Browns.  The following season, Lamanno caught Ewell Blackwell's no-hitter on June 18, 1947.

References

External links

1919 births
1994 deaths
United States Navy personnel of World War II
Baseball players from Oakland, California
Birmingham Barons players
Cincinnati Reds players
Columbia Reds players
Major League Baseball catchers
Muskogee Reds players
National League All-Stars
Oakland Oaks (baseball) players
Seattle Rainiers players
Syracuse Chiefs players